Sachsenwald was a fishing trawler that was requisitioned by the Kriegsmarine during the Second World War. She served as a supply ship, the weather ship WBS 7 Sachsenwald and the vorpostenboot V 414 Sachsenwald. She was sunk in the Bay of Biscay in August 1944 by Royal Navy and Royal Canadian Navy ships.

Description
The engine was made by Deschimag Seebeckwerft, Wesermünde, Germany. It was rated at 168nhp. The engine powered a single screw propeller driven via a low pressure turbine, double reduction gearing and a hydraulic coupling.

History
Sachsenwald was built as yard number 631 by Deschimag Seebeckwerft for the Nordsee Deutsche Hochseefischerei Bremen-Cuxhaven. She was launched in June 1939. Her port of registry was Wesermünde. At the outbreak of the Second World War, she was interned in Murmansk, Soviet Union, but was requisitioned by the Kriegsmarine in January 1940. Initially serving as a supply ship allocated to Basis Nord, Sachsenwald was intended for use in Operation Sea Lion before being converted for use as a weather ship under the designation Wetterbeobachtungsschiff 7, with the Pennant number WBS 7.

Bismarck survivors
After sailing through heavy seas, and being briefly attacked by a Bristol Blenheim aircraft with machine gun fire, she reached the debris field left after the sinking of Bismarck on 28 May. After several hours searching the field, which contained only bodies and debris, Sachsenwald communicated with two U-boats that were also searching the area. Finally, late in the night, they discovered a raft containing two survivors, and took them on board. They were Matrosengefreite Walter Lorenzen and Otto Maus. Sachsenwald continued to search the area, recovering an empty raft from Bismarck but failed to find any more survivors. She reached it without incident, discharging the survivors, and tying up at Bordeaux on 1 June.

Sinking
On 29 August 1941, WBS 7 Sachsenwald was re-designated as a vorpostenboot. She was allocated to 4 Vorpostenbootflotille operating in the Bay of Biscay out of Bordeaux. She served as V 414 Sachsenwald. In August 1944 she formed part of a seven-ship convoy, which included V 414Sachsenwald, V 1549 Höheweg, M 263, M 486 and SG 3 Sans Souchi, which was carrying ammunition from St. Nazaire to La Pallice. They were intercepted early in the morning of 6 August by Force 26, which was carrying out Operation Kinetic.

Notes

a.  A number of internet sources state that Sachsenwald recovered five Bismarck survivors. This appears to be a widely repeated error based on a faulty source. The official report of Sachsenwalds commander states only two survivors were picked up, Lorenzen and Maus. The other 3 Bismarck survivors rescued by the Germans (Georg Herzog, Otto Höntzsch & Herbert Manthey) were all rescued by the German uboat U-74.

Citations

Bibliography

Further reading
Ludovic Kennedy Pursuit: The Sinking of the Bismarck

1939 ships
Ships built in Bremen (state)
Steamships of Germany
Fishing vessels of Germany
World War II merchant ships of Germany
Weather ships
Auxiliary ships of the Kriegsmarine
World War II auxiliary ships of Germany
World War II patrol vessels of Germany
Maritime incidents in August 1944
World War II shipwrecks in the Atlantic Ocean
Shipwrecks in the Bay of Biscay
Trawlers